XHAGP-FM is a radio station on 92.7 FM in Agua Prieta, Sonora. XHAGP is owned by María de Lourdes Robeson Chávez on behalf of the Centro Evangelístico Agua Viva religious association and carries a Spanish Christian format known as Radio Alcance.

History
XHAGP was approved for a concession in December 2016 and received it three months later. The station came to air by the end of April.

The concessionaire, María de Lourdes (Marilú) Robeson Chávez, is the wife of the pastor of the Centro Evangelístico, José Luis de la Torre.

Radio Alcance is the sister station to Alcance TV, a cable TV channel operated by the same religious association.

References

Radio stations in Sonora
Radio stations established in 2017
Christian radio stations in Mexico
Evangelical radio stations